Thomas William Parsons (August 18, 1819, Boston – September 3, 1892, Scituate, Massachusetts) was an American dentist and poet.

Parsons was educated at the Boston Latin School, and visited Italy to study Italian literature in 1836-7. His translation of Dante's  Divine Comedy, which eventually comprised all the Inferno, two-thirds of the Purgatorio and fragments of the Paradiso, began to appear in 1843. After practicing dentistry in Boston, he lived for several years in England before returning to Boston in 1872. He was a contributor to The Galaxy and The Atlantic Monthly. In 1857 he married Anna (or Hannah) M. Allen (1821-1881).

Works
The First Ten Cantos of the Inferno of Dante, 1843
Poems, 1854
(ed. C. E. Norton), The Divine Comedy of Dante Aligheri, 1893

References

External links

 
 

1819 births
1892 deaths
American dentists
Italian–English translators
Translators of Dante Alighieri
19th-century American poets
American male poets
19th-century translators
19th-century American male writers
19th-century dentists